Hrvoj Oskar Ninoslav Pleminiti Somogji, commonly known as Nino Sydney, was an Australian architect who served as the chief architect of Lendlease from 1961 to 1973.

As a sportsperson, he was a professional water polo player and received a silver medal at the World Masters Games in 2002.

Biography
Sydney was born in Zagreb, Croatia. He completed his studies in architecture from the University of Zagreb in 1954. He also studied at University of Sydney between 1956 and 1958.

In 1955, he emigrated to Australia.

In 2015, he received National Trust Heritage Award.

Award
 National Trust Heritage Award (2015)

References

20th-century births
2022 deaths
Architects from Zagreb
Architects from Sydney
Croatian emigrants to Australia
University of Zagreb alumni
Australian male water polo players